The 1965–66 Norwegian 1. Divisjon season was the 27th season of ice hockey in Norway. Six teams participated in the league, and Valerenga Ishockey won the championship.

Regular season

External links 
 Season on eliteprospects.com

Nor
GET-ligaen seasons
1965 in Norwegian sport
1966 in Norwegian sport